Pablo del Río (born 11 January 1976 in Buenos Aires) is a former Argentine footballer. He played for a number of clubs in Argentina, Aucas in Ecuador and Beitar Jerusalem in Israel.

External links
 Profile and statistics of Pablo del Rio on One.co.il 
 Pablo del Río - Argentine Primera statistics at Fútbol XXI  
 Pablo del Río at BDFA.com.ar 

1976 births
Living people
Footballers from Buenos Aires
Argentine footballers
Club Atlético Independiente footballers
Club Atlético Banfield footballers
Ferro Carril Oeste footballers
Beitar Jerusalem F.C. players
Argentine Primera División players
Argentine expatriate footballers
Expatriate footballers in Ecuador
Expatriate footballers in Israel
Argentine expatriate sportspeople in Israel
Israeli Premier League players
Association football forwards
Argentine expatriate sportspeople in Ecuador